Paddington General Hospital was a health facility in Harrow Road, Paddington, London.

History
The hospital was established as an infirmary for the Paddington Union Workhouse and opened as the Paddington Infirmary in 1886. A nurses' home was completed in 1921. It became Paddington Hospital in 1929 and, after joining the National Health Service in 1948, it became Paddington General Hospital in 1954.

The facility was gradually integrated into St Mary's Hospital as St Mary's Hospital (Harrow Road) from 1968 and, after services had been completely transferred to St Mary's Hospital, the facility in Harrow Road closed in 1986. The hospital was subsequently demolished and the site was redeveloped for residential use with the Woodfield Road Surgery now being the only clinical presence remaining there.

References

Defunct hospitals in London